Pavel Samusenko (born 9 August 2001) is a Russian swimmer. He competed in the men's 4 × 50 metre medley relay event at the 2021 FINA World Swimming Championships (25 m) in Abu Dhabi.

References

External links
 

2001 births
Living people
Russian male swimmers
Place of birth missing (living people)
Medalists at the FINA World Swimming Championships (25 m)